Mushroom 11 is an puzzle-platform game created by Untame. The game is a 2D side-scroller where players control a green mushroom by deleting parts of cells while it simultaneously regrows. The mushroom can be split and shaped to solve puzzles.

Development
The game was started at the 2012 Global Game Jam event at New York University. Mushroom 11 uses the game engine Unity. It has also been supported by Indie-Fund. The music for the game was licensed from The Future Sound of London.

Reception

Mushroom 11 received positive early critical response for the game's unique mechanic and theme. It was a finalist for the IGF 2014 Excellence in Design. IGN awarded it a score of 9.0 out of 10, saying "Mushroom 11 is a strange and unique game that reshapes the way you think about its puzzles."

Mushroom 11 was nominated by IGN for its "Most Innovative" game of 2015 award.

References

External links

Developer website

2015 video games
Linux games
MacOS games
Puzzle-platform games
Side-scrolling video games
Single-player video games
Video games developed in the United States
Games financed by Indie Fund
Windows games
Apple Design Awards recipients